The 1908 Nashville vs. New Orleans baseball game dubbed by Grantland Rice "The Greatest Game Ever Played in Dixie" was a 1–0 pitching duel to decide the Southern Association championship in the dead-ball era, on the last day of the season. The Nashville Vols won the game and thus the pennant by .002 percentage points, after finishing the prior season in last place. Both teams had the same number of losses (56), but the New Orleans Pelicans were in first place with 76 wins to the Vols' second-place 74. Carl Sitton used his spitball to out-pitch Ted Breitenstein for a complete-game, nine-strikeout, four-hit, shutout. According to one account, "By one run, by one point, Nashville has won the Southern League pennant, nosing New Orleans out literally by an eyelash. Saturday's game, which was the deciding one, between Nashville and New Orleans was the greatest exhibition of the national game ever seen in the south and the finish in the league race probably sets a record in baseball history".

Nashville scored in the seventh inning with the bases loaded. With two outs, catcher Ed Hurlburt hit a single. Then Sitton did too. Harry "Deerfoot" Bay bunted perfectly down the third base line, Bay's fondest memory in his long baseball career. Julius Augustus "Doc" Wiseman then drove in the winning run. Sitton was thrown out at home after Hurlburt scored. The time of the game was one hour and forty-two minutes.

Box score

References

Bibliography

Baseball games
Nashville vs. New Orleans game
Nashville Vols
New Orleans Pelicans (baseball)
Nashville vs. New Orleans baseball game
Nashville vs. New Orleans baseball game
Nicknamed sporting events
20th century in Nashville, Tennessee
Sports competitions in Nashville, Tennessee